Saint-Jouan-des-Guérets is a commune in the Ille-et-Vilaine department of Brittany in northwestern France.

Population

Inhabitants of Saint-Jouan-des-Guérets are called jouannais in French.

See also
Communes of the Ille-et-Vilaine department
Jean-Marie Valentin

References

External links

Official website 

Mayors of Ille-et-Vilaine Association 

Communes of Ille-et-Vilaine